"Shadow Dancing" is a disco song performed by English singer-songwriter Andy Gibb. The song was released in April 1978 as the lead single from his second studio album of the same name. The song reached number one for seven weeks on the Billboard Hot 100 in 1978.  Albhy Galuten (who also produced this song) arranged the song with Barry Gibb. While Andy Gibb would have three more Top 10 hits in the U.S., this would be his final chart-topping hit in the United States. The song became a platinum record.

Song development
The song was written by Andy and his brothers (Barry, Maurice and Robin Gibb) in Los Angeles, while the trio of brothers were working on the film Sgt. Pepper's Lonely Hearts Club Band.  "And one night," Andy would recall, "while we were relaxing, we sat down and we had to start getting tracks together for the album" (also titled Shadow Dancing, which would eventually hit #7 on the U.S. album charts). "So we literally sat down and in ten minutes, we had a group going, (singing) the chorus part.  As it says underneath the song, we all wrote it, the four of us."

Release
According to Billboard's Book Of Number One Hits, Gibb became the first solo artist in the history of the U.S. pop charts to have his first three singles hit the number-one spot. It remained in the top spot for seven straight weeks from 17 June to 29 July 1978, keeping "Baker Street" by Gerry Rafferty from reaching the top spot. On 5 August it was replaced by The Rolling Stones with their hit "Miss You." Additionally, "Shadow Dancing" was listed by Billboard as being the number one single of 1978.  The song peaked at number eleven on the soul chart and sold 2.5 million copies in the United States alone.  Cash Box particularly praised the "solid arrangement of strings, horns, [and] disco-funk guitar work."  Record World predicted that "this rather hushed dance record should be [Gibbs'] third straight hit."

The single had three different B-sides. The US version's "Let It Be Me" and the European version's "Too Many Looks In Your Eyes" were both from Gibb's previous album Flowing Rivers, while the Italian release featured "Fool for a Night" from the Shadow Dancing album.

In July that year, Gibb performed "Shadow Dancing" at the Jai-Alai Fronton Studios in Miami, when Barry, Robin and Maurice unexpectedly joined him on stage, and sang this song with him. It was the first time that all four brothers performed together in concert.

Personnel
Andy Gibb — lead and background vocals
Barry Gibb — background and harmony vocals, orchestral arrangement
John Sambataro — background and harmony vocals
Joey Murcia — electric guitar
Tim Renwick — electric guitar
Ron Zigler — drums
George Bitzer — Fender Rhodes electric piano, Hohner clavinet
Harold Cowart — bass
Joe Lala — percussion
Albhy Galuten — orchestral arrangement
Peter Graves — horns
Whit Sidener — horns
Ken Faulk — horns
Bill Purse — horns
Neil Bonsanti — horns
Stan Webb — horns

Chart history

Weekly charts

Year-end charts

All-time charts

Cover version
"Shadow Dancing" was included on the album Hail Satin released in 2021 by the Dee Gees (an alter ego of the Foo Fighters). Lead vocals on this cover were sung by Taylor Hawkins.

References

1978 singles
Songs written by Barry Gibb
Songs written by Robin Gibb
Songs written by Maurice Gibb
Songs written by Andy Gibb
Andy Gibb songs
Song recordings produced by Barry Gibb
Billboard Hot 100 number-one singles
Cashbox number-one singles
RPM Top Singles number-one singles
RSO Records singles
Disco songs
Song recordings produced by Albhy Galuten
1978 songs
Songs about dancing